Jeffrey Davies (born 1967 in Washington, D.C.) is an American rock musician best known as the original lead guitarist of the psychedelic rock band The Brian Jonestown Massacre.
In documentary Dig by Ondi Timowner,
Davies cowrote the theme song with Anton Newcombe for the HBO series 'Boardwalk Empire': "Straight Up and Down" from 1996 album "Take it From the Man" -Played in the band from 1992 to 1999. He rejoined the band in 2001 only to quit again in 2003. Spending much of his early years in Washington D.C., Davies' family moved to New Mexico where he spent his teen years before eventually moving to San Francisco. While in San Francisco he would become a member of The Brian Jonestown Massacre, replacing Patrick Straczek appearing on the majority of their recordings.
Davies has appeared as a guest guitarist and instrumentalist for the LA based neo-psych experimental collective Kill Kill Kill.

References

American rock guitarists
American male guitarists
American indie rock musicians
Living people
1967 births
American keyboardists
The Brian Jonestown Massacre members
20th-century American guitarists
20th-century American male musicians